Barilius naseeri is a fish in genus Barilius of the family Cyprinidae.

References 

N
Fish described in 1986